Dirty Angel may refer to:
Dirty Angel (1958 film), German film Schmutziger Engel
Dirty Angel (1982 film), 1982 Hong Kong film
"Dirty Angel", track on 2004 Airbourne EP Ready to Rock